Postboy Creek is a stream in the U.S. state of Ohio. The nearby community of Postboy, Ohio takes its name from the creek.

Postboy Creek was named in memory of William Cartmell, a young mail carrier (post boy). Cartmell was murdered in a robbery in 1825, a crime for which the perpetrator was later hanged.

See also
List of rivers of Ohio

References

Rivers of Tuscarawas County, Ohio
Rivers of Ohio